Wernya punctata is a moth in the family Drepanidae. It was described by Yoshimoto in 1987. It is found on Peninsular Malaysia.

References

Moths described in 1987
Thyatirinae
Moths of Malaysia